United Nations Security Council Resolution 30, adopted on August 25, 1947, upon having learning of the desire of both the Netherlands and Indonesian Nationalists in the Indonesian National Revolution to comply with United Nations Security Council Resolution 27, the Council requested that each of its members recall a diplomatic officer from Batavia to instruct them on the situation.

The resolution was adopted seven votes to none, with four abstentions from Colombia, Poland, the Soviet Union and the United Kingdom.

See also
List of United Nations Security Council Resolutions 1 to 100 (1946–1953)

References
Text of the Resolution at undocs.org

External links
 

 0030
Indonesian National Revolution
 0030
 0030
1947 in Indonesia
1947 in the Netherlands
August 1947 events